First Eagle Investments is a US investment management company based in New York City that is an adviser to the First Eagle Funds.  The company manages a number of investment strategies and Investment funds including the First Eagle Global Fund, First Eagle Overseas Fund and First Eagle Fund of America.

History
First Eagle Investments traces its heritage to a family owned bank, Gebr. Arnhold (Arnhold Brothers) founded in 1864 in Dresden, Germany. In 1931, Hans Arnhold combined his firm with S. Bleichroeder to form Arnhold and S. Bleichroeder. In 1937, Hans Arnhold as Chairman and his son-in-law, Stephen Kellen, as CEO restarted the firm's activities in New York City, where the firm remains headquartered until the present day.

The firm launched its first offshore fund, First Eagle Fund N.V in 1967, followed by its first US-registered mutual fund, First Eagle Fund of America in 1987 whose initial portfolio manager was Michael Kellen.

In 1999, Arnhold and S. Bleichroeder  acquired the majority share of Société Générale Asset Management, a subsidiary of the French bank Société Générale whose investment team managed global value equity strategies. At that time, the firm became the investment adviser to the First Eagle Funds, including the SocGen International Fund, later named the First Eagle Global Fund. The team managing these strategies became First Eagle's Global Value Team.

In 2002 the firm exited investment banking and global businesses to focus exclusively on investment management. In 2009 Arnhold and S. Bleichroeder renamed into First Eagle Investment Management.

Private equity companies Blackstone Group and Corsair Capital acquired a majority stake in the firm in 2015. Founding families and employees maintain a significant ownership stake in First Eagle.

First Eagle Investment Management added alternative credit capabilities via the acquisitions of NewStar Financial in 2017, and THL Credit in 2020, subsequently renamed as First Eagle Alternative Credit.

As of 2020 the firm’s investment capabilities focus on equities, fixed income, multi-asset and alternative credit. Key investment strategies include: Global Value, International Value, U.S. Value, U.S. Dividend Equity, Global Income, Gold, High Yield, Broadly Syndicated Loans and Direct Lending.

Funds
The First Eagle Global Value team manages seven mutual funds: First Eagle Global Fund, First Eagle Overseas Fund, First Eagle U.S. Value Fund, First Eagle Gold Fund, First Eagle Global Income Builder Fund, First Eagle High Yield Fund, First Eagle Fund of America and First Eagle Credit Opportunities Fund. The First Eagle Alternative Credit team manages First Eagle Alternative Capital BDC, Inc., and First Eagle Senior Loan Fund.

References

External links 
 First Eagle Funds Official Website
 First Eagle Investment Management Official Website
First Eagle Alternative Credit Official Website

Investment management companies of the United States
Companies based in New York City